SDH Institute Pte Ltd (abbreviation: School D'Hospitality; Chinese: 新加坡酒店管理学院) is a hospitality and tourism management school located in Singapore. Established in Year 2007, It is registered with the Committee for Private Education (CPE). SDH Institute is a Private Education Institute in Singapore offering hospitality education. SDH Institute offers Hospitality and Tourism Management programs from Certificate, Diploma, Advanced Diploma, Post-Graduate, Bachelor's Degree to MBA and also professional learning programmes.

It has a teacher to student ratio at 1:40 for lectures and 1:20 for tutorials with support from full-time lecturers.

The school was established in 2007 as School D' Hospitality. It changed to its current name on 8 October 2012.

Partners
School D’Hospitality has industry links and internship partners like Rasa Sentosa Resorts, Hilton Hotels & Resorts, Holiday Inn, Goodwood Park Hotel, and the Fullerton Hotel. Academic partners include the Association of Business Executives, which is an international examining board and provider of business and management qualifications that lead to degree and master's routes.

References

Education in Singapore
Hospitality schools in Singapore
Private universities in Singapore
Educational institutions established in 2007
2007 establishments in England